Damian Sinclair McKenzie (born 20 April 1995) is a New Zealand rugby union player who plays fullback or First five-eighth for Waikato in the Bunnings NPC competition and Chiefs in super rugby . McKenzie has played 40 tests for New Zealand since his international debut in 2016.

McKenzie began his professional career playing for Waikato in the Bunnings NPC. McKenzie has also previously represented the Chiefs in Super Rugby, he is their all-time highest points scorer.

Early life
McKenzie, of European and Māori descent, was born in 1995 in Invercargill. He received his secondary education at Christ's College in Christchurch.

Domestic rugby

McKenzie has received attention for his trademark smile before attempting a kick at goal.

Since the beginning of the 2015 season, McKenzie has been contracted to the  franchise who compete in the Super Rugby competition. He has become a regular starter and is often in charge of goal kicking.

In 2016, McKenzie played every game in the Chiefs' starting line-up at fullback. He finished the 2016 Super Rugby season as the Chiefs top try-scorer and the overall second highest try-scorer with 10 tries, behind Waratahs outside-back Israel Folau. He also finished the season as the second highest point-scorer with 199 points (10 tries, 43 conversion goals and 21 penalty goals); behind Hurricanes First Five Eighth Beauden Barrett.

McKenzie ranked top of the charts for carries, metres and defenders beaten in the 2017 Super Rugby season, while also ranked in the top three for clean breaks and points scored. In 2018, Damian McKenzie was the SANZAAR Player of the Season for the  third year running.

On the 15th of April 2019, McKenzie was diagnosed with a torn ACL suffered against the Blues at FMG Stadium Waikato in the Super Rugby competition. Due to the injury, McKenzie was not able to participate in the 2019 Rugby World Cup in Japan.

On the 8th of February 2020, Damian Mckenzie was named at fullback for the Chiefs in their 25-15 victory over the Crusaders after recovering from his ACL injury.

In 2020, Damian Mckenzie was chosen for the North Island to play in the North vs South rugby union match at Sky Stadium. Mckenzie kicked 100% off the boot, scoring 15 points, while also scoring a try and setting up another couple.

Damian Mckenzie kicked off 2021 with a hiss and a roar, scoring tries in the Chiefs opening games of their Super Rugby Aotearoa season against the Highlanders and the Crusaders. Mckenzie then put on an inspiring performance, playing away at Sky Stadium against the Hurricanes to end the Chiefs record-breaking 11 match losing streak dating back to pre Covid 19 lockdown. He then scored the winning try against the Blues in the last minute the following week, the Chiefs snatching the victory 12-8. Following the bye week, Mckenzie slotted a historical match winning penalty against the Higlanders - from around 50m, in the first ever golden point extra time in New Zealand rugby. Again stealing the victory, winning 26-23 at Forsyth Barr Stadium. After three close wins, McKenzie then did it again. Knocking over the winning penalty in the dying minutes to beat the Crusaders (25-23) at home to a raucous crowd. He played at first five eight where he kicked at 100%, and out played incumbent All Blacks first-five, Richie Mo’unga. The following week he kicked another game winning penalty in the 84th minute from 45 metres to beat the Hurricanes (26-24) at home. He moved back to fullback and kicked 6 from 7 and scored 16 of the Chiefs 26 points. The Chiefs ended the regular season 2nd place and lost to the Crusaders in the Final. McKenzie finished 2021 Super Rugby Aotearoa as the top points scorer with 111 points.

Damian Mckenzie started at 10 in the Chiefs opening 2 games of Super Rugby Trans-Tasman, beating the Western Force and The Brumbies. In the 22nd minute of their encounter with the Queensland Reds, Mckenzie was red carded for a high shot on halfback, Tate McDermott. The Chiefs playmaker was struck with a 3 game suspension for his actions.

International

McKenzie represented New Zealand Under-20 during the 2014 IRB Junior World Championship scoring 1 try, 7 conversions and 2 penalties in 5 games.

On 29 May 2016, McKenzie was named in New Zealand's 33-man All Blacks squad for the June Test series against Wales.  Although he was part of the All Blacks training camp, he did not play during the Test series due to winger Israel Dagg's return from injury.

McKenzie was initially excluded from the All Blacks' 33-man squad for the 2016 Rugby Championship but was called up as injury cover for winger Waisake Naholo following Naholo tearing a hamstring. On 1 October 2016, McKenzie made his international test debut coming off the bench as a replacement for Ryan Crotty in the 48th minute during New Zealand's 36-17 win over Argentina in the round 5 of the Rugby Championship. On the 2016 All Blacks Northern Hemisphere Tour and following the All Blacks' first ever defeat to Ireland, he made his starting debut in the starting 15 playing at fullback in the teams' 68-10 win over Italy. McKenzie was not subbed off against Italy and played the full 80 minutes, with Israel Dagg subbed off in McKenzie's favour.

On 17 June 2017, McKenzie started for the Māori All Blacks at first-five-eighth against the touring British and Irish Lions in Rotorua. McKenzie played until the 67th minute when he was replaced by Ihaia West, with the Māori All Blacks losing to the tourists 10-32.

Despite an outstanding Super Rugby campaign with the Chiefs in 2017, McKenzie was not selected in the initial squad for the All Blacks for the Pasifika Challenge against Samoa and the three-test British and Irish Lions series, with the uncapped Hurricanes utility back Jordie Barrett being selected at McKenzie's expense.  However, he was recalled to the team following Ben Smith's concussion in the first test. Despite being re-called, McKenzie did not manage to make the field in the black jersey against the Lions.

With Jordie Barrett ruled out for the rest of 2017 with shoulder surgery following the conclusion of Super Rugby and while Ben Smith took a sabbatical following the 35-29 victory over Australia on 26 August 2017, McKenzie received more game-time featuring at Fullback. The week prior which was a 54-34 win over the Australians saw McKenzie score his first try for the All Blacks off a pass from Rieko Ioane. His performances starting against Australia saw McKenzie become a regular starter for the All Blacks and he played in every single Rugby Championship test starting at fullback in 2017. Following a good performance against Argentina in Buenos Aires on 1 October 2017, where he scored a try and set All Blacks captain Kieran Read up for the opening try, McKenzie earned the award for Man of the Match. McKenzie earned that honour in two consecutive tests, winning the award the following week in the 25-24 win against South Africa where he played well and scored another try. McKenzie's try in the second test against South Africa saw him finish the 2017 Rugby Championship as the third-to-highest try scorer in the competition behind Rieko Ioane and Wallaby fullback Israel Folau, finishing the competition with four tries.

McKenzie's great form from the Rugby Championship continued in the 2017 end-of-year tests, with McKenzie having great defensive displays against Australia and France. McKenzie was able to maintain form and ended the 2017 season with good performances in wins over Scotland and Wales.

In 2018, Mckenzie was selected in the All Blacks squad for the June Test Series against France. In the first test he immediately made an impact of the bench, scoring a try from a 60m break, and assisting Ngani Laumape minutes later. In the second test Mckenzie came of the bench in the 10th minute to replace the injured Beauden Barrett. McKenzie had a mixed game, playing well enough to earn the start against the French for the 3rd test. Mckenzie scored 24 points, scoring 2 tries and setting up another couple, kicking 7/7 goals. The All Blacks won the series 3-0.

McKenzie did not get any starts during the 2018 Rugby Championship. Coming off the bench against for the first four tests, he was then sent home from Argentina for a family bereavement and was dropped the next week against the Springboks in favour of Richie Mo'unga. McKenzie played well throughout the Championship with the opportunities he got, only playing a total of 106 minutes throughout the whole Rugby Championship.

McKenzie got his chance to start, playing at Fullback in the third Bledisloe Cup match in Japan on the Northern Tour where he produce an outstanding performance combining with fellow play-maker Beauden Barrett in steering the team around the field during the All Blacks' 37-20 win over the Wallabies. Mckenzie was then retained at Fullback for the rest of the All Blacks Northern Tour matches, where he produced a fine showing against England, scoring the sole All Blacks try in their 16-15 victory at Twickenham. Mckenzie started at fullback in the 16-9 defeat to Ireland in Dublin.

Having torn his ACL during Super Rugby, McKenzie was not considered for 2019 Rugby World Cup selection due to injury.

After playing a significant role for the Chiefs during Super Rugby Aotearoa, Damian Mckenzie was named in the 2020 All Blacks squad. Mckenzie had limited game time, preferred off the bench, due to the continuation of the Mounga-Barrett partnership. Starting only one game, against The Wallabies. Mckenzie played limited minutes of the bench in matches with Argentina and The Wallabies

Damian Mckenzie was named in the All Blacks 36 man squad for the 2021 Steinlager Series. Mckenzie was picked at fullback for the first test against Tonga, where he scored the teams first try in a 102-0 win. Mckenzie was named in the squads for the two tests vs Fiji where the All Blacks comfortably beat Fiji.

Mckenzie was later named in the All Blacks 36 man squad for the 2021 Rugby Championship. Mckenzie was picked at fullback for the first match against Australia where he scored a try and helped the All Blacks to a 33-25 win. One week later he started at fullback against Australia where the All Blacks got the win 57-22, Mckenzie notably made a 57 meter long penalty kick in this game. This win also sealed the Bledisloe Cup for New Zealand. He dominated the whole series.

Career honours

Waikato
 Ranfurly Shield Holder, 2015-2016
 NPC Champion, 2021

New Zealand

 Rugby Championship/Tri Nations Champion, 2016,2017,2018,2020 and 2021
 Bledisloe Cup Winner, 2017,2018,2020 and 2021

International record

References

1995 births
Living people
New Zealand rugby union players
Waikato rugby union players
Rugby union fly-halves
Rugby union fullbacks
Rugby union players from Invercargill
Chiefs (rugby union) players
Māori All Blacks players
People educated at Christ's College, Christchurch
New Zealand international rugby union players
Tokyo Sungoliath players